Brandon Moore (born November 25, 1976) is an American composer known for Universal's Aliens Ate My Homework (2018) and the sequel Aliens Stole My Body (2020) featuring the voice talents of William Shatner and George Takei. He’s also known for the comedy-horror series Killer Sisters' Midnight Hour (2012) for Hulu, and the IFS Festival's Best Drama winner The Year I Did Nothing (2019). Brandon was a musician at an early age and a life-long film music fan. Upon completing his undergrad in music theory and composition in Fort Worth, TX, he moved to Los Angeles to attend USC's Film Scoring program. Brandon has composed a wide range of scores for a variety of film projects and genres. His music has played in film festivals all over the world for as long as he's been an active composer in Hollywood.

Biography

Early life

Brandon Moore grew up listening to film scores and performing music in his native Arlington, Texas. His father John Moore (1942-2011) was an architect and his mother Cheryl Ford-Mente, a communications director for non-profit organizations, was heavily involved in Dallas-Fort Worth community theater as an actress and fundraiser and host of a local cable talk show "Around Arlington." Brandon's parents encouraged him to start playing music at an early age. He switched from piano, viola, and finally settling on the trombone in high school. Brandon credits his dad for his introduction to film music:

My dad would buy these soundtrack albums. He had a wide range of vinyl, but he occasionally had a pop soundtrack album and a score album here and there, but there were three that I remember listening to a lot: Raiders of the Lost Ark, Return of the Jedi and Superman: The Movie. And I wore these records out, scratched them and everything. I was probably about 11 years old when I realized they were all written by John Williams.

Education
In 1999 he graduated from Texas Christian University with a Bachelor of Music degree in music theory and composition.  That same year he moved to Los Angeles to study film scoring professionally at the University of Southern California's Scoring for Motion Pictures and Television program. At USC, Brandon had the privilege of studying under accomplished film composers Elmer Bernstein, David Raksin and Christopher Young.

Discography

Soundtracks

Works

Films

Series

Audio Dramas

Concert Works

Awards, nominations and recognition

Nominations
2018 Audio Verse Awards Finalist - Original Compositions for Self-Contained Productions and Original Compositions for Dramatic Productions - episode The Current for Earbud Theater

2012 Park City Film Music Festival Award Nomination for Best Impact of Music in a Documentary - The Table

References/Notes and references

External links
Official Website
Brandon Moore on IMDb
Brandon Moore Music Official YouTube
Brandon Moore on Vimeo
Brandon Moore Music on SoundCloud
Brandon Moore on Spotify
Brandon Moore on Pandora
Film Score Monthly 2018 Interview with Brandon Moore on composing Aliens Ate My Homework
Film Score Monthly 2020 Interview with Brandon Moore on composing Aliens Stole My Body

1976 births
American film score composers
Musicians from Texas
Texas Christian University alumni
University of Southern California alumni
Living people